The W.A.R. BF-109 is a near-scale homebuilt replica of a Messerschmitt Bf 109 fighter.

Variants
Some versions were built using  Lycoming O-235 and  HCI radial engines.

Specifications (W.A.R. BF-109)

See also 
 Peak Aerospace Me 109R
 Roland Me 109 Replica

Notes

References

WAR German BF-109

External links
 War Aircraft Replicas International Inc 
 W.A.R. Aircraft Replicas International

Homebuilt aircraft
BF-109
Single-engined tractor aircraft
Low-wing aircraft
1980s United States sport aircraft
Replica aircraft